Agaronia gibbosa is a species of sea snail, a marine gastropod mollusk in the family Olividae, the olives.

Description
The shell of this species measures 40-75 mm in length.

Agaronia gibbosa is variable in shape, but large specimens tend to be distinguished from other Agaronia by the large spire callus and bulbous shape (most Agaronia are narrower and rather bullet-shaped). In its natural state, the shell of Agaronia gibbosa is usually a blotched greenish color with a striped yellow band at the siphonal end, though the species also comes in an all-yellow variety. This species is common in the shell trade and it is common for the outer layer of the shell to be polished away, revealing a brownish-black color underneath.

Distribution
Populations of 'this marine species' are found in the Indian Ocean, typically near the shores of the Indian sub-continent and Indonesia.

References

 Raven J.G.M. (Han) & Recourt P. (2018). Notes on molluscs from NW Borneo. 4. Olivoidea (Gastropoda, Neogastropoda), with the description of eight new species. Vita Malacologica. 17: 113–155.

External links
 Born, I. (1778). Index rerum naturalium Musei Cæsarei Vindobonensis. Pars I.ma. Testacea. Verzeichniß der natürlichen Seltenheiten des k. k. Naturalien Cabinets zu Wien. Erster Theil. Schalthiere. [1–40], 1–458, [1–82]. Vindobonae; (Kraus)
 Gmelin J.F. (1791). Vermes. In: Gmelin J.F. (Ed.) Caroli a Linnaei Systema Naturae per Regna Tria Naturae, Ed. 13. Tome 1(6). G.E. Beer, Lipsiae [Leipzig]. pp. 3021–3910
 Marrat, F. P. 1870-1871. Monograph of the genus Oliva. In: G.B. Sowerby II (ed.), Thesaurus Conchyliorum, vol. 4 (29–30): 1–46 [1871], pl. 328bis–341 [1870], 342–351 [1871]. London, privately published
 Tan S.K. [Siong Kiat], Ng H.E. [Hiong Eng], Chan S.Y. [Sow Yan] & Nguang L.H.S. [Leo H.S.]. (2019). A review of the Recent Agaronia Gray, 1839 (Caenogastropoda: Olividae) of the Sundaic region, with description of a new species. Occasional Molluscan Papers. 7: 1–19

Olividae
Gastropods described in 1778